A tolbooth is a traditional Scottish 'town hall' for the administration of burghs, usually providing a council meeting chamber, a court house and a jail.

Tolbooth may also refer to:

 Tholsel, an ancient term for a town administrative house and gated toll house in Ireland. Similar to the English term tolsey

See also 

 Tollbooth (disambiguation)